Tomopterus is a genus of beetles in the family Cerambycidae, containing the following species:

 Tomopterus albopilosus Zajciw, 1964
 Tomopterus aurantiacosignatus Zajciw, 1969
 Tomopterus basimaculatus Zajciw, 1964
 Tomopterus brevicornis Giesbert, 1996
 Tomopterus clavicornis Magno, 1995
 Tomopterus consobrinus Gounelle, 1911
 Tomopterus exilis Chemsak & Linsley, 1979
 Tomopterus flavofasciatus Fisher, 1947
 Tomopterus grossefoveolatus Zajciw, 1964
 Tomopterus kunayala Giesbert, 1996
 Tomopterus larroides White, 1855
 Tomopterus longicornis Zajciw, 1969
 Tomopterus obliquus Bates, 1870
 Tomopterus pictipennis Zajciw, 1969
 Tomopterus quadratipennis Bates, 1873
 Tomopterus rufotibialis (Zajciw, 1968)
 Tomopterus seabrai Magno, 1995
 Tomopterus servillei Magno, 1995
 Tomopterus similis Fisher, 1930
 Tomopterus staphylinus Audinet-Serville, 1833
 Tomopterus tetraspilotus Magno, 1995
 Tomopterus vespoides White, 1855

References

 
Rhinotragini